Kdyně is a town in Domažlice District in the Plzeň Region of the Czech Republic. It has about 5,100 inhabitants.

Administrative parts
Villages of Branišov, Dobříkov, Hluboká, Modlín, Nové Chalupy, Podzámčí, Prapořiště, Smržovice and Starec are administrative parts of Kdyně.

Geography
It lies mostly in the Cham-Furth Depression.

History
The first written mention of Kdyně is from 1396, but the settlement was founded at the latest in the 13th century. In 1508, for the first time Kdyně is referred as a town. The oldest textile manufactory in Bohemia was founded here in 1696. Kdyně has been involved in textile production for hundreds of years.

Demographics

Transport
The town features a train station on the railroad line Klatovy–Domažlice.

Sights

Church of Saint Nicholas is a landmark of the town and one of its most significant buildings. It was founded in the 2nd half of the 14th century and enlarged in 1763–1768.

The Borderland Museum has exhibitions dedicated to the history of the sub-region, the specifics of the border (trade, smuggling, etc.) and crafts, especially the tradition of the textile industry in the town.

Dům v kožichu (lit. "House in a fur coat") from around 1780 is one of the oldest preserved houses in Kdyně. It is a cultural monument and part of the Borderland Museum, which illustrates the living of previous generations in this house and the way of life.

The Jewish synagogue was opened in 1863 and it served religious life until 1936. Today it serves cultural purposes and contains an exhibition on the history of the town's Jewish population. The Neoromanesque synagogue contains a unique mikveh. After the mikveh was abolished in 1940, it was rebuilt in 2008 and it is the only mikveh in Central Europe from the 21st century.

Rýzmberk Castle is a ruin of a castle on the Rýzmberk hill from the 2nd half of the 13th century.

Gallery

References

External links

Cities and towns in the Czech Republic
Populated places in Domažlice District